Pedro, Prince of Brazil (Lisbon, 19 October 1712 – Lisbon, 29 October 1714) was the second child of John V of Portugal and Maria Ana of Austria. He was made Prince of Brazil and Duke of Braganza upon his birth. He died at the age of two, making his brother Joseph (future Joseph I of Portugal) the new Prince of Brazil.

Ancestry

References 

1712 births
1714 deaths
Princes of Brazil
House of Braganza
Dukes of Braganza
18th-century Portuguese people
Heirs apparent who never acceded
Burials at the Monastery of São Vicente de Fora
Royalty and nobility who died as children
Sons of kings